Van Dam's girdled lizard (Smaug vandami) is a species of lizard in the family Cordylidae. The species is endemic to South Africa.

Geographic range
The type locality of S. vandami is Gravelotte, Limpopo, South Africa.

Habitat
The preferred natural habitats of S. vandami are grassland and savanna.

Description
It has a triangular shaped head, and spiny dorsal scales. The predominant colour is dark brown with fragmented yellow rings.

Behaviour
S. vandami is largely solitary and hides in cracks in rocks.

Reproduction
S. vandami is ovoviviparous. From two to six young are born alive in summer.

Etymology
The species is named for the collector of the type specimens, Gerhardus Petrus Frederick van Dam (died 1927), who was a South African herpetologist.

Common names
Other common names for S. vandami include the Afrikaans name ouvolk, meaning "old folk".

References

Further reading
FitzSimons V (1930). "Descriptions of New South African Reptilia and Batrachia, with Distribution Records of Allied Species in the Transvaal Museum Collection". Annals of the Transvaal Museum 14 (1): 20–48. (Zonurus vandami, new species, pp. 25–27, Figures 6–7).
Loveridge A (1944). "Revision of the African Lizards of the Family Cordylidae". Bulletin of the Museum of Comparative Zoölogy at Harvard College 95 (1): 1–118. (Cordylus warreni vandami, new combination, pp. 23–24).
Reissig J (2014). Girdled Lizards and their relatives: Natural History, Captive Care and Breeding. Frankfurt am Main: Edition Chimaira. 249 pp. .
Stanley EL, Bates MF (2014). "Here be dragons: a phylogenetic and biogeographical study of the Smaug warreni species complex (Squamata: Cordylidae) in southern Africa". Zoological Journal of the Linnean Society 172 (4): 892–909.
Stanley EL, Bauer AM, Jackman TR, Branch WR, Mouton PLFN (2011). "Between a rock and a hard polytomy: Rapid radiation in the rupicolous girdled lizards (Squamata: Cordylidae)". Molecular Phylogenetics and Evolution 58 (1): 53–70. (Smaug vandami, new combination).

External links
Photographs

Smaug (genus)
Endemic reptiles of South Africa
Reptiles described in 1930
Taxa named by Vivian Frederick Maynard FitzSimons